Spencer John Bent, VC, MM (known as "Joe") (18 March 1891 – 3 May 1977) was an English recipient of the Victoria Cross, the highest and most prestigious award for gallantry in the face of the enemy that can be awarded to British and Commonwealth forces.

Biography 
He was 23 years old, and a drummer in the 1st Battalion, The East Lancashire Regiment, British Army during the First World War when the following deed took place for which he was awarded the VC.

On the night of 1–2 November 1914, near Le Gheer, Belgium, when his officer, the platoon sergeant and a number of men had been struck down, Drummer Bent took command of the platoon and with great presence of mind and coolness succeeded in holding the position. He had previously distinguished himself on two occasions, on 22 and 24 October by bringing up ammunition under heavy shell and rifle fire. Again, on 3 November, he brought into cover some wounded men who were lying, exposed to enemy fire, in the open.

Bent was a Freemason and was initiated into Aldershot Camp Lodge No. 1331 on 8 December 1920.

He later achieved the rank of Company Sergeant-Major. He survived the war and died on 3 May 1977. Bent was cremated at West Norwood Cemetery, London.

Bent's VC, along with his Military Medal and Russian Cross of St. George was sold at auction in June 2000 for £80,000. His VC is on display in the Lord Ashcroft Gallery at the Imperial War Museum, London.

Sources

References
Drummer Spencer John Bent, VC (Henry L. Kirby, R.R. Walsh, 1986)
Monuments to Courage (David Harvey, 1999)
The Register of the Victoria Cross (This England, 1997)
VCs of the First World War - 1914 (Gerald Gliddon, 1994)

External links
Corporal John Bent (biography)
Spencer John Bent (biography and action account - on the Stowmarket, Its History and Heritage site)
Location of grave and VC medal (S.W. London)
VC medal auction details

1891 births
1977 deaths
People from Stowmarket
East Lancashire Regiment soldiers
Recipients of the Military Medal
British Army personnel of World War I
British World War I recipients of the Victoria Cross
English drummers
British male drummers
Burials at West Norwood Cemetery
British Army recipients of the Victoria Cross
British military musicians
Recipients of the Cross of St. George
Freemasons of the United Grand Lodge of England
20th-century British male musicians
20th-century British musicians
Military personnel from Suffolk